Margaret Withers (6 July 1893 – 26 October 1977) was a British actress mainly on the stage.

Filmography

References

External links
 

Year of birth unknown
Year of death unknown
British stage actresses
British film actresses
20th-century British actresses
1893 births